The 1999 Junior World Sports Acrobatics Championships was the sixth edition of the junior acrobatic gymnastics competition, then named sports acrobatics, and took place in Nowa Ruda, Poland, from October 7 to 9, 1999. The competition was organized by the International Gymnastics Federation.

Medal summary

Results

References

Junior World Acrobatic Gymnastics Championships
Junior World Acrobatic Gymnastics Championships
International gymnastics competitions hosted by Poland
Junior World Gymnastics Championships